Andrew Binny Ritchie (born Edinburgh, 1880; died Wonersh, 1956) was an Anglican priest, most notably Archdeacon of Surrey from 1949  to 1955.

Ritchie was educated at Edinburgh Academy, followed by Durham University (Hatfield College) and Wells Theological College. Binny was ordained in 1904. He served London curacies at Stratford Bow and Eaton Square.

He died on 20 January 1956.

References

List of people educated at Edinburgh Academy

1956 deaths
1880 births
Clergy from Edinburgh
Alumni of Hatfield College, Durham
Alumni of Wells Theological College
Archdeacons of Surrey
People educated at Edinburgh Academy